

212001–212100 

|-id=073
| 212073 Carlzimmer ||  || Carl Zimmer (born 1966) is a world-renowned popular science writer and science advocate. He has authored over a dozen science related books covering topics such as viruses, evolution, and heredity. || 
|}

212101–212200 

|-id=176
| 212176 Fabriziospaziani ||  || Fabrizio Spaziani (1963–2012), Italian anaesthetist, posthumously awarded the Italian gold medal for civil merit || 
|}

212201–212300 

|-bgcolor=#f2f2f2
| colspan=4 align=center | 
|}

212301–212400 

|-id=373
| 212373 Pietrocascella ||  || Pietro Cascella (1921–2008) was an Italian sculptor, painter and ceramist. His greatest work is the monument at Auschwitz. || 
|-id=374
| 212374 Vellerat ||  || The Swiss village of Vellerat, located at the bottom of a mountain range in the canton of Jura, between the towns of Delemont and Moutier || 
|}

212401–212500 

|-id=465
| 212465 Goroshky ||  || Goroshky settlement, currently Volodarsk-Volynsky, museum of decorative and precious stones in Ukraine. || 
|-id=500
| 212500 Robertojoppolo || 2006 RT || Roberto Joppolo (born 1939) is an Italian sculptor. His main works are statues and church doors realized in bronze. || 
|}

212501–212600 

|-id=587
| 212587 Bartasiute ||  || Stanislava Bartasiute (born 1953), associate professor at the Astronomical Observatory of Vilnius University. || 
|}

212601–212700 

|-id=606
| 212606 Janulis ||  || Rimvydas Janulis (born 1953), a Lithuanian astronomer || 
|-id=631
| 212631 Hsinchu ||  || Hsinchu is a city in northern Taiwan, popularly nicknamed "The Windy City" for its windy climate. Hsinchu Science Park is renowned as the Silicon Valley of Asia. || 
|-id=692
| 212692 Lazauskaite ||  || Romualda Lazauskaite (born 1961), a Lithuanian astronomer || 
|}

212701–212800 

|-id=705
| 212705 Friûl ||  || Friuli (also known as "Friûl" in the Friulian language) is an area of northeast Italy with its own particular cultural and historical identity. It comprises the major part of the autonomous region of Friuli-Venezia Giulia, and is the place where the discovering Remanzacco Observatory is located. The name Friuli originates from the ancient Roman town of Forum Iulii. || 
|-id=723
| 212723 Klitschko ||  || The Klitschko brothers, Vitali (born 1971) and Wladimir (born 1976), widely known Ukrainian heavyweight boxers and philanthropists || 
|-id=795
| 212795 Fangjiancheng ||  || Fang Jiancheng (born 1965), is an academician of the Chinese Academy of Sciences. He has been recognized as a leader in Inertial Instrument and System Technology, and the founder of theory and practice of Magnetically Suspended Inertial Actuators in China. || 
|-id=796
| 212796 Guoyonghuai ||  || Guo Yonghuai (1909–1968), a professor at University of Science and Technology of China, served as the first dean of the Department of Chemical Physics. He was one of the founders of modern mechanics in China, and made significant contributions to mechanics, applied mathematics and aeronautics. || 
|-id=797
| 212797 Lipei ||  || Li Pei (1917–2017), a professor at University of Science and Technology of China and a famous linguist, made significant contributions to the foreign language teaching and research. She was honored as "the mother of Chinese applied linguistics". || 
|}

212801–212900 

|-bgcolor=#f2f2f2
| colspan=4 align=center | 
|}

212901–213000 

|-id=924
| 212924 Yurishevchuk ||  || Yuri Shevchuk (born 1957), Russian poet, composer and producer, cult rock performer and long-time leader of the rock band DDT. || 
|-id=929
| 212929 Satovski ||  || Boris Satovski (1908–1982), Russian inventor, scientist and laureate of the USSR State Prize || 
|-id=977
| 212977 Birutė ||  || Birutė (died 1382) was the second wife of Kestutis, Grand Duke of Lithuania, and mother of Vytautas the Great. There is very little known about Birut\.e's life, but after her death a strong cult devoted to her developed among Lithuanians. || 
|-id=981
| 212981 Majalitović ||  || Maja Litović Crnić (born 1958), a Croatian amateur astronomer || 
|-id=991
| 212991 Garcíalorca ||  || Federico García Lorca (1898–1936), Spanish poet, dramatist and theater director || 
|-id=998
| 212998 Tolbachik || 3931 T-3 || Tolbachik, the complex volcano on the Kamchatka Peninsula in the Russian Far East. The highest summit rises to 3182 meters. || 
|}

References 

212001-213000